Emmanuel Nwankwo, known by his stage name Emmy Gee, is a Nigerian rapper based in South Africa. His debut single "Rands and Nairas" peaked at number 7 on South Africa's official music chart. He started recording music at age 16 and worked with producer Shizzi in 2004. He co-founded the entertainment and clothing apparel company known as Teamtalkless.

Early life and breakthrough single
Emmy Gee was born in Nigeria and is a descendant of the Igbo tribe. He is the last born of four siblings. He completed his primary and secondary education in Nigeria prior to moving to South Africa. Emmy Gee's debut single "Rands and Nairas" was released in 2013. It features rap vocals from AB Crazy and DJ Dimplez. In an interview with Zalebs in 2014, Emmy Gee said he had a feeling the song was going be successful after recording it. He revealed that AB Crazy wrote the song's hook and said they recorded the song to showcase the unity between Nigeria and South Africa. The music video for "Rands and Nairas" was shot and directed in South Africa by Nick Roux of Molotov Cocktail Productions. On July 14, 2014, Emmy Gee released the remix of "Rands and Nairas", featuring Ice Prince, AB Crazy, Anatii, Phyno, Cassper Nyovest and DJ Dimplez. Emmy Gee was among the few artists selected to perform at MTN's first Mandela Day concert in 2014.

Personal life
Emmy Gee has a daughter named Emily Grace who was born in South Africa in 2016.

Discography

Singles

As featured artist

Awards and nominations

See also
List of Nigerian rappers

References

Living people
Igbo singers
Nigerian hip hop singers
Nigerian male rappers
21st-century Nigerian  male singers
1986 births